Krivoborye is a rural locality (a village) in Gorozhanskoye Rural Settlement, Ramonsky District, Voronezh Oblast, Russia. The population was 710 as of 2010. There are 3 streets.

Geography 
Krivoborye is located 26 km northwest of Ramon (the district's administrative centre) by road. Knyazevo is the nearest rural locality.

References 

Rural localities in Ramonsky District